CKMM-FM (103.1 MHz) is a Top 40/CHR radio station owned by Bell Media, branded as 103.1 Virgin Radio. The station broadcasts from 1445 Pembina Highway, Winnipeg, Manitoba, with sister stations CFWM-FM and CFRW, while its transmitter is located at Duff Roblin Provincial Park.

History
On March 13, 1979, Armadale Communications was awarded a license for a new FM station in Winnipeg, to broadcast on 103.1 MHz. On February 14, 1980, the station signed on air as CKWG-FM, with a near freeform format. In 1989, the station flipped to adult contemporary. The following year, the station was sold to Western World Communications. The call signs have changed quite a bit over the years, from CHZZ-FM (Z103) to CKLU-FM (103 U FM, then briefly Mix 103) and then finally to CKMM-FM. The General Manager of "Mix" was Jim Millican - who, at one time, was tour manager of famed Winnipeg band, The Guess Who. Barry Horne was Program Director under Millican. Toronto jock and voiceover Adrian Bell replaced well-known jock Don Percy in Mornings, with beloved Winnipeg broadcaster Maureen Murphy sharing morning show duties. CKMM's format and on-air line up was short-lived.

Throughout the 1980s and early 1990s, CHZZ-FM was also used on the Videon Cable Program Guide. In 1996, the station switched to a country format with the on-air name Star 103. When CKMM and CFQX-FM came under the ownership of Craig Broadcasting, the format of CKMM was changed to avoid redundancy. CKMM re-launched with a Top 40/CHR format as Hot 103 on New Year's Eve, 1997. CKMM and CFQX became properties of Standard Radio in 2002.

On October 29, 2007, Astral Media took over CKMM as a result of a buyout of Standard Radio. As part of Astral's merger with Bell Media on June 27, 2013, sister station CFQX and Bell's CHIQ-FM were sold to the Jim Pattison Group in order to meet ownership limits.

On August 31, 2012, CKMM rebranded as 103.1 Virgin Radio, becoming the seventh "Virgin" branded station in Canada.

References

External links
 103.1 Virgin Radio
 

Kmm
Kmm
Kmm
Radio stations established in 1998
Virgin Radio
1998 establishments in Manitoba